Erycesta is a genus of flies in the family Tachinidae.

Species
Erycesta caudigera Rondani, 1861
Erycesta hertingi Richter, 1976

References

Diptera of Europe
Diptera of Asia
Exoristinae
Tachinidae genera